Telepanovo (Teläpän) is a rural locality (a village) in Iteyevsky Selsoviet, Ilishevsky District, Bashkortostan, Russia. The population was 307 as of 2010. There are 3 streets.

Geography 
Telepanovo is located 23 km northeast of Verkhneyarkeyevo (the district's administrative centre) by road. Iteyevo is the nearest rural locality.

References 

Rural localities in Ilishevsky District